Anonymous was an Irish television series broadcast on RTÉ Two. Its concept was to disguise well-known personalities, with the use of prosthetic masks, bestow upon them a fake identity, and set them up in what were intended to be humorous situations for the sake of entertainment.

Format and history
Anonymous was presented by Jason Byrne, who also used a hidden microphone to communicate mischievous ideas via whispering to the disguised personality. It ran for five series, with the last series broadcast in 2009. Byrne was offered funding for a further season, but turned it down, stating that it was too hard to find people who didn't know of the show and therefore saw through the ruses (its sister program, Naked Camera, did not help matters). He wanted the show to be remembered as being good while it lasted, and not being cancelled when it became desperate. Byrne was the celebrity who went anonymous in the final episode (Hector O hEochagain, the second ever guest behind Samantha Mumba, presented the show).

Participants
The series is known for showing the then Progressive Unionist Party leader David Ervine in a humorous light in an episode filmed before his death in January 2007. Ervine was one of three political representatives from Northern Ireland who agreed to partake in the programme; the others were Paul Maskey of Sinn Féin and John Dallat of the SDLP.

They were interviewed by Belfast comedian Patrick Kielty, who was in the guise of New York TV reporter, "Betty Silverman". Ervine's family consented for the episode to be broadcast in the aftermath of his death.

In the opening episode of the third series, Westlife member Nicky Byrne, was dressed up as Mick Byrne, "an evangelistic Garda from Kiltimagh on a mission to clean up the mean streets of Swords." For the role he had to put on a Longford accent and, as Garda Byrne, he took the names of foreign nationals, asking them for their licence to be in Ireland; asked locals for cigarettes, and chastised people for walking too fast and speaking too loudly in the betting shop. He then drove around the local shopping centre in a motorised trolley making his own siren sound and asking people where they were going. He called to his own parents' house to ask for Westlife autographs and tickets for Croke Park and makes a fool of his friends, former Leeds United footballer Gary Kelly and rugby international Brian O'Driscoll.

Also featuring in the series were model Glenda Gilson as a tree-hugging eco-warrior, and TV presenter Craig Doyle as Argentine sports reporter "Rodrigo Depassa".

International versions
Anonymous has several different versions around the world, with the format being produced in countries including;

Germany, Romania, Spain (La Sexta), UK (ITV) (with Stephen Mulhern),

British channel ITV started broadcasting its own hour-long version of the show on Saturday 18 July 2009, allotting it a prime time spot at 6.30pm.

In ITV's first episode, X Factor judge Louis Walsh, actress and comedian Jennie McAlpine, Richard Arnold (TV presenter), former English rugby union player Austin Healey, actress Michelle Keegan, (singer Shayne Ward and former English rugby captain Matt Dawson went 'Anonymous'.

Episodes
This is an incomplete and comprehensive list of episodes of Anonymous.

Series 1 (2006)

Series 2 (2007)

Series 3 (2008)
The third series featured Nicky Byrne, Glenda Gilson and Craig Doyle amongst others.

Series 4 (2009)

Series 5 (2011)

References

External links
 Official site
 RTÉ press release

2006 Irish television series debuts
Irish comedy television shows
RTÉ original programming